The Manchester Statistical Society is a learned society founded in 1833 in Manchester, England. It has a distinguished history, having played an important part in researching economic and social conditions using social surveys. It continues to be active as a forum for the discussion of social and economic issues and also in promoting research.

Origins and early history
The Manchester Statistical Society is one of the oldest statistical societies in the world and the first of its kind in Britain, having been founded in September 1833.  This was a time when there was a growing interest in statistics and their use in understanding the state and the problems of society, and a Statistics Section of the British Association for the Advancement of Science had been formed earlier in 1833. The Society was the first of around 20 such societies that were either mooted or actually formed in Britain in the early Victorian period; only that in Manchester and what was originally called the Statistical Society of London (now the Royal Statistical Society) still exist.

The founders of the Society included three men who had key roles in the Manchester and Salford District Provident Society, also founded in 1833: the secretaries, James Phillips Kay (later Sir James Phillips Kay-Shuttleworth), a doctor, and William Langton, a banker; together with the treasurer, Benjamin Heywood, also a banker. The Provident Society used house-to-house visits to collect information about the needy in Manchester in order to provide support. Another involved in the Statistical Society at the outset was cotton spinner John Kennedy, who had been present at the meeting at which the Statistics Section of the British Association for the Advancement of Science was initiated.

The Statistical Society members were described by Selleck as “imaginative and intellectually ambitious”. Many were Whigs, many were Unitarians; and 17 of the 40 members in 1835 worked in the cotton industry. While the Society planned to collect facts concerning the inhabitants of the district of Manchester, what was also important was the use to which the findings could be put: it was “a Society for the discussion of subjects of political and social economy, and for the promotion of statistical enquiries, to the total exclusion of party politics”. The Society’s first annual report indicated that the Society “owes its origin to a strong desire felt by its projectors to assist in promoting the progress of social improvement in the manufacturing population by which they are surrounded”, the background being the conditions of working people and their families, which reflected the effects of the industrial revolution in Manchester.

A pioneer in social surveys

Some of the Society’s early meetings considered statistics already collected elsewhere. A major impetus to the Society’s work, however, came when Charles Poulett Thomson, Vice-President of the Board of Trade, suggested that the Society itself collect statistical information on, for example, the condition of the working people of Manchester. This led to the Society achieving prominence with its innovative work of several social surveys, involving considerable effort to collect detailed data, as in the report on 4,102 families in parts of Manchester, based on house-to-house research. The work was extended to cover surrounding towns, with agents paid to visit houses and collect data, the results summarised in reports.
 
An important subject of the Society’s early enquiries was education. The reports in its first eight years included surveys of the state of education in Manchester, Bury, Salford, Liverpool, Rutland and Hull; the findings were “totally condemnatory of the situation then existing”. The Society’s early reports on education had, according to Butterfield, helped make Manchester the most education-conscious city in England. Selleck described the Society as “a pioneer in new intellectual ways”.

By 1840 the Society had 60 members; they included a dozen people who were significant in running the Anti-Corn Law League. The Society had, by then, issued 22 reports and 51 papers. According to Abrams, the Society, in its early years, did more impressive work than the Statistical Society of London.

Development

The Society was unable to keep up its early momentum; the 1840s saw fewer reports and declining membership. Credited with helping the Society avoid dissolution was Edward Herford, a coroner, who enlisted 16 new recruits in 1846. The driving force of the Society in the 1840s was John Roberton, a doctor at the Lying in Hospital in Manchester; he shared an interest in collation and interpretation of medical statistics with fellow members such as James Phillips Kay. Roberton was author of eight of the 15 papers known to have been presented to the Society from its 1842-43 session to 1849-50. In total he read 27 papers to the Society, on matters as diverse as the effect of climate on man, municipal government, national schools of Ireland, and evils affecting railway labourers.

Medical and related matters were important in the Society’s meetings; in 1875 Wilkinson found that one-third of the papers read before the Society had been on sanitary and kindred matters and John Pickstone, a medical historian, says that the Manchester Statistical Society 

The nature of the Society's activities was, however, changing, with Elesh highlighting a switch from original research to secondary analyses, using statistics collected elsewhere; he concluded that the Society failed to institutionalise survey research. There was also a trend toward historical essays and discussions of more general questions of political economy, such as decimal coinage.
 
Economics was developing as a profession, and began to be represented in the membership of the Society and the papers presented. One of the new members in 1865-66 was Stanley Jevons, who had accepted a teaching post in Manchester; in 1867 he became Professor in Political Economy at Cambridge. Jevons presented a paper on the progress of the mathematical theory of political economy in 1874, though many of the Society’s meetings were non-technical, across a varied range of topics. Examples of subjects covered in the 1870s, both economic and non-economic, were trade unions, population statistics, the American financial crisis, the cotton trade, prison discipline and sanitary progress in Manchester.
 
The Society continued to take opportunities to be involved in the contribution that statistics could play in public policy: in 1900 its council addressed the House of Lords in favour of a quinquennial census, and suggested changes in the classification of workers in the cotton and coal industries, which were adopted by the Registrar-General.

Membership of the Society increased to over 200 in 1879 and was then never below 170 until World War I. However, when the centenary was about to be celebrated in 1933, the Society faced a deficit, and a special appeal was made to members.

The second century

The Society continued its regular meetings, covering a range of economic and social subjects. Past presidents include two Nobel Laureates in economics, John Hicks and Arthur Lewis.

Although the Society’s activities were primarily of a non-technical nature, there were opportunities for groups of members interested in more technical subjects. In 1933-34 a group for the study of statistical methods began to hold meetings, it being re-formed as a group for the study of economic statistics in 1956-57. An industrial group was also formed for engineers and others interested in statistical quality control in industrial production, this series of meetings beginning in 1943-44. The Society’s ordinary meetings continued with a range of subjects: for example, its 1956-57 session saw discussions on the U.K. life assurance industry, economic aspects of fibre production, Soviet industrial expansion, British trade unions and the new gold standard.

The Society formed an economic forecasting study group in 1970-71. Over time meetings of the Society’s specialist, more technical groups were arranged as joint meetings with the Royal Statistical Society and the North Western branch of the Institute of Statisticians, but meetings became infrequent in the 1980s.

In 1983 the Society celebrated its sesquicentenary with a special two-day conference, held at the University of Manchester. The Society’s president at the time was Dame Kathleen Ollerenshaw, who was a member of the Society from 1944 until her death in 2014.

The society became a registered charity (No. 1069363) in 1998.

Current activities

The society continues, aiming to attract new members, without any professional qualifications being necessary.  It holds regular meetings addressed by expert speakers, the focus being the discussion of social and economic affairs, examples of subjects being health, social care, policing, economic forecasting, regional economic development and inequality.

The A.H. Allman Prize was endowed in 1951 and is awarded annually to a statistics student at the University of Manchester. Allman was honorary secretary of the Society for 26 years and members made a monetary presentation to him, which Allman asked to be used to establish the prize, which is administered by the University of Manchester.

The Society was a beneficiary of the estate of Sir Harry Campion and the bequest was placed into a trust fund to provide occasional modest grants to support research consistent with the Society's objective and history.
 
The Society first published its Transactions in 1853, containing papers presented to the Society. This, now a long-running journal, illustrates the wide range of subjects in the Society’s remit. The Society’s archives, dating back to its foundation, are kept at Manchester Central Library and the contents can be searched online.

Officers

Presidents
Presidents of the Manchester Statistical Society have been:

See also 
List of societies for education in Manchester

References

Citations

 

</ref>

Pickstone, John (19–26 December 1987). "Manchester's History And Manchester's Medicine". British Medical Journal (Clinical Research Edition). BMJ Publishing Group. 295 (6613): 1604–1608. . JSTOR 29529232. PMC 1257489. .

External links
 Manchester Statistical Society Homepage

S
Organisations based in Manchester
Organizations established in 1833
Science and technology in Greater Manchester
Statistical organisations in the United Kingdom
1833 establishments in England
Charities based in Manchester
Charities based in Greater Manchester
Clubs and societies in Greater Manchester